Desmiphora elegantula is a species of beetle in the family Cerambycidae. It was described by Adam White in 1855. It is known from Brazil, Venezuela and French Guiana.

References

Desmiphora
Beetles described in 1855